This is a list of defunct airlines from Uruguay.

See also
 List of airlines of Uruguay
 List of airports in Uruguay

References

Uruguay
Airlines
Airlines, defunct
Airlines